Helen Moses Cassidy (July 6, 1905–April 8, 1985) was an American swimmer. She was an alternate swimmer in the women's relay team at the 1920 Summer Olympics. Moses began swimming in Coconut Island then trained by George Center at the Outrigger Canoe Club in Honolulu beganning in 1919. She graduated from Punahou in 1924. She married Charles E. Cassidy in 1930 and had a daughter.

References

1905 births
1985 deaths
Swimmers from Hawaii
American female swimmers
20th-century American women
20th-century American people